Terebralia semistriata, common name the striate mud creeper, is a species of sea snail, a marine gastropod mollusk in the family Potamididae.

Description
The length of the shell varies between 35 mm and 75 mm.

Distribution
This marine species occurs also in intertidal flats, mangroves, mud-silt off Papua New Guinea and Australia (Northern Territory, Queensland, Western Australia).

References

 Röding, P.F. 1798. Museum Boltenianum sive Catalogus cimeliorum e tribus regnis naturae quae olim collegerat Joa. Hamburg : Trappii 199 pp. 
 Mörch, O.A.L. 1852. Catalogus Conchyliorum quae reliquit d. Alphonso d'Aguirra & Gadea Comes de Yoldi, regis daniae cubiculariorum princeps, ordinis dannebrogici in prima classe & ordinis caroli Tertii eques. Part 1. Cephalophora. Copenhagen : Hafinae Vol. 1 170 pp.
 Sowerby, G.B. 1855. Thesaurus Conchyliorum, or monographs of genera of shells. London : Sowerby Vol. 2(16) 847–899, pls 176–186.
 Sowerby, G.B. 1865. Monograph of the genus Pyrazus. Reeve's manuscript. pl. 1 in Sowerby, G.B. (ed). Conchologia Iconica. London : L. Reeve & Co. Vol. 15.
 Tryon, G.W. (ed.) 1887. Solariidae, Ianthinidae, Trichotropidae, Scalariidae, Cerithiidae, Rissoidae, Littorinidae. Manual of Conchology. Philadelphia : G.W. Tryon Vol. 9 488 pp., 71 pls. 
 Houbrick, R.S. 1991. Systematic review and functional morphology of the mangrove snails Terebralia and Telescopium (Potamididae; Prosobranchia). Malacologia 33(1): 289-338
 Wilson, B. 1993. Australian Marine Shells. Prosobranch Gastropods. Kallaroo, Western Australia : Odyssey Publishing Vol. 1 408 pp.

External links
 

Potamididae
Gastropods described in 1852